(February 20, 1586 – March 29, 1620) was a Japanese daimyō of the Edo period, who ruled the Tokushima Domain. His court title was Awa no kami. He married Manhime (1592–1666), daughter of Ogasawara Hidemasa

Yoshishige fought during the Siege of Osaka at the Battle of Kizugawa.

Family
 Father: Hachisuka Iemasa
 Mother: Jiko-in (1563-1606)
 Wife: Manhime (1592–1666)
 Children:
 Hachisuka Tadateru by Manhime
 Mihohime (1603-1632) married Ikeda Tadakatsu by Manhime
 Shotokuin (1614-1683) married Mizuno Narisada by Manhime

1586 births
1620 deaths
Daimyo
Hachisuka clan